Appomattox River Bridge, also known as Route 24 Bridge, is a historic road bridge located near Appomattox, Appomattox County, Virginia, in the Appomattox Court House National Historical Park.  The bridge has specially designed elements that commemorate the end of the American Civil War.

Bridge
T-beam bridges were first constructed in Virginia in the 1920s and were a dominant concrete bridge design from the late 1920s through the late 1960s. The Appomattox River Bridge was built in 1930, and is a common single-span, T-beam, non-arched concrete bridge.

Commemoration
Each bridge rail consists of nine panels in three sections,  posts separate the sections. Each section features three alternating panels displaying stylized designs recalling the Confederate battle flag and the Union's stars and stripes flag.

The bridge was listed on the National Register of Historic Places in 2005.

See also
List of bridges on the National Register of Historic Places in Virginia

References

Road bridges on the National Register of Historic Places in Virginia
Buildings and structures in Appomattox County, Virginia
Appomattox Court House National Historical Park
Concrete bridges in the United States